This is a list of destinations that ExpressJet Airlines served prior to the termination of its independent "branded" flying on September 2, 2008. Destinations served as "Continental Express operated by ExpressJet Airlines" are not included. Between these destinations, ExpressJet Airlines served 20 markets with 44 of the airline's Embraer ERJ 145 aircraft.

United States

Arizona 
 Tucson (Tucson International Airport)

California 
 Fresno (Fresno Yosemite International Airport)
 Long Beach (Long Beach Airport)
 Monterey (Monterey Peninsula Airport)
 Ontario (LA/Ontario International Airport) (hub)
 Sacramento (Sacramento International Airport) (focus city)
 San Diego (San Diego International Airport) (focus city)
 Santa Barbara (Santa Barbara Airport)

Colorado 
 Colorado Springs (Colorado Springs Airport)

Illinois 
 Chicago (O'Hare International Airport)

Florida 
 Jacksonville (Jacksonville International Airport)
 Miami (Miami International Airport) (charter)
 Tallahassee (Tallahassee International Airport)

Idaho 
 Boise (Boise Airport)

Louisiana 
 New Orleans (Louis Armstrong New Orleans International Airport) (focus city)
 Shreveport (Shreveport Regional Airport) [Charter Only]

Maryland 
 Baltimore (Baltimore/Washington International Airport)

Missouri 
 Kansas City (Kansas City International Airport)

Nebraska 
 Omaha, Nebraska (Eppley Airfield)

Nevada 
 Reno/Tahoe (Reno-Tahoe International Airport) (seasonal)

New Mexico 
 Albuquerque (Albuquerque International Sunport)

North Carolina 
 Raleigh/Durham (Raleigh-Durham International Airport)

Oklahoma 
 Oklahoma City (Will Rogers World Airport)

South Carolina 
 Columbia (Columbia Metropolitan Airport)

Texas 
 Austin (Austin-Bergstrom International Airport) (hub)
 El Paso (El Paso International Airport)
 San Antonio (San Antonio International Airport)

Virginia 
 Norfolk (Norfolk International Airport)
 Roanoke (Roanoke Regional Airport) [Charters only]

Washington 
 Spokane (Spokane International Airport)

Destinations can be found at: http://www.xjet.com

Lists of airline destinations